Neozephyrus is a genus of butterflies in the family Lycaenidae. Species in this genus are mainly distributed in East Asia. The larval food plant is alder or - for Neozephyrus quercus - oak .

List of species
 Neozephyrus coruscans (Leech, 1894) western and central China
 Neozephyrus dubernardi (Riley, 1939) Yunnan
 Neozephyrus helenae Howarth, 1957 China
 Neozephyrus japonicus (Murray, 1875) Amur Oblast, Ussuri, northeast China, Korea, Japan, Taiwan
 Neozephyrus quercus (Linnaeus, 1758) - purple hairstreak
 Neozephyrus taiwanus (Wileman, 1908) Taiwan
 Neozephyrus uedai Koiwaya, 2003 Burma 
 Neozephyrus asahii  Fujioka, 2003 China (Kouy Tcheou)

See also
Chrysozephyrus 
Favonius

References
 Biolib
 , 2000. On the genus Favonius (s. str.) in the continental Ashia. Gekkan-Mushi, (348): 18–22. 
 , 2002: Descriptions of seven new species and a new subspecies of Theclini (Lycaenidae) from China and Indo-China. Gekkan-Mushi 373: 5-14. 
 , 1953: On some new Lycaenids from Japan (II). Transactions of the Lepidopterological Society of Japan 4 (2/3): 10–12. Abstract and full article: . 
Beitrag zur Systematik der Theclinae im Kaiserreich Japan unter besonderer Berucksichtigung der sogenannten Gattung Zephyrus (Lepidoptera: Lycaenidae). Nature Life (Kyungpook J. bio. Sci.) 15: 33–46, figs.

External links
"Neozephyrus Sibatani & Ito, 1942" at Markku Savela's Lepidoptera and Some Other Life Forms

 
Lycaenidae genera